Herter is a German occupational surname for a herdsman. Notable people with the surname include:

 Albert Herter (1871–1950), American painter; son of Christian, the furniture maker
 Christian Herter (1895–1966), American politician;  son of Albert, the painter
 Christian Archibald Herter (physician) (1865–1910), American physician; son of Christian, the furniture maker
 David Herter, American author
 Ernst Herter (1846–1917), German sculptor
 George Leonard Herter (1911–1994), American manager of Herter's Inc. sporting goods business and author
 Gérard Herter (1920-2007), German actor
 Hans Herter (1899–1984), German philologist
 Wilhelm Gustav Franz Herter (1884−1958), German botanist

See also
 Herter Brothers: Gustav (1830–1898) and Christian Herter (1839–1883), American furniture makers

Occupational surnames